This is a comprehensive list of the discography of the jazz saxophonist and composer Wayne Shorter as a leader and sideman.

As leader/co-leader

As member 
The Young Lions
with Frank Strozier, Lee Morgan, Bobby Timmons, Bob Cranshaw, Albert Heath and Louis Hayes
 The Young Lions (Vee-Jay, 1961) – rec. 1960

The Jazz Messengers

 1959: Africaine (Blue Note, 1981)
 1959: Paris Jam Session (Fontana, 1961)
 1960: A Night in Tunisia (Blue Note, 1961)
 1960: Like Someone in Love (Blue Note)
 1960: Meet You at the Jazz Corner of the World (Blue Note, 1967)
 1960: The Big Beat (Blue Note, 1960)
 1961: Roots & Herbs (Blue Note, 1970)
 1961: A Day with Art Blakey (Baybridge (Japan), 1981)
 1961: Art Blakey!!!!! Jazz Messengers!!!!! (Impulse!, 1961)
 1961: Buhaina's Delight (Blue Note, 1963)
 1961: Mosaic (Blue Note, 1962)
 1961: The Freedom Rider (Blue Note, 1964)
 1961: The Witch Doctor (Blue Note, 1969)
 1961: Tokyo 1961 (Solar, 2014)
 1961: Paris Jazz Concert: Olympia May 13th 1961 (Trema (F), 1992)
 1962: Caravan (Riverside, 1963)
 1961-62: Three Blind Mice (Blue Note, 1962)
 1963: Ugetsu (Riverside, 1963)
 1963: Golden Boy (Colpix, 1963)
 1964: Free for All (Blue Note, 1965)
 1964: Kyoto (Riverside, 1966)
 1964: Indestructible (Blue Note, 1966)

Weather Report

 1971: Weather Report (Columbia, 1971)
 1972: I Sing the Body Electric (Columbia, 1972)
 1972: Live in Tokyo (CBS/Sony, 1972)
 1973: Sweetnighter (Columbia, 1973)
 1973-74: Mysterious Traveller (Columbia, 1974)
 1975: Tale Spinnin' (Columbia, 1975)
 1975-76: Black Market (Columbia, 1976)
 1976-77: Heavy Weather (Columbia, 1977)
 1978: Mr. Gone (Columbia, 1978)
 1979: 8:30 (Columbia, 1979)
 1980: Night Passage (Columbia, 1980)
 1981: Weather Report (Columbia, 1982)
 1983?: Procession (Columbia, 1983)
 1983: Domino Theory (Columbia, 1984)
 1984: Sportin' Life (Columbia, 1985)
 1985: This Is This! (Columbia, 1986)

The Manhattan Project
with Gil Goldstein, Lenny White, Michel Petrucciani, Pete Levin and Stanley Clarke
 The Manhattan Project (Blue Note, 1990) – rec. 1989

As sideman 

With Miles Davis
 1959-62 Jingle Bell Jazz (Columbia, 1962) – on "Blue Xmas (To Whom It May Concern)"  
 1963 The Giants of Jazz (Columbia, 1963) – on "Devil May Care," the one Davis track on this Columbia anthology; also released as single B-side of "Seven Steps to Heaven"
 1964: Miles in Berlin (Columbia, 1965)
 1965: E.S.P. (Columbia, 1963)
 1965: The Complete Live at the Plugged Nickel 1965 (Legacy, 1995)
 1966: Miles Smiles (Columbia, 1967)
 1967: Sorcerer (Columbia, 1967)
 1967: Nefertiti (Columbia, 1968)
 1966-67: Miles Davis at Newport 1955-1975: The Bootleg Series Vol. 4 (Legacy, 2015)
 1967: Live in Europe 1967: The Bootleg Series Vol. 1 (Legacy, 2011)
 1967-68: Water Babies (Columbia, 1976) 
 1968: Miles in the Sky (Columbia, 1968)
 1968: Filles de Kilimanjaro (Columbia, 1969)
 1969: In a Silent Way (Columbia, 1969)
 1969: 1969 Miles Festiva De Juan Pins (CBS/Sony, 1993)
 1969: Live in Europe 1969: The Bootleg Series Vol. 2 (Legacy, 2013)
 1969: Bitches Brew (Columbia, 1970)
 1970 Live at the Fillmore East (Columbia,  2001)
 compilation: Big Fun (Columbia, 1974)
 compilation: Circle in the Round (Columbia, 1979)
 compilation: Directions (Columbia, 1980)

With Herbie Hancock
 1975: Man-Child (Columbia, 1975)
 1976: VSOP (Columbia, 1977)
 1977: VSOP: The Quintet (Columbia, 1975)
 1977: VSOP: Tempest in the Colosseum (CBS/Sony, 1977)
 1979: VSOP: Live Under the Sky (CBS/Sony, 1979)
 1983: Sound-System (Columbia, 1984)
 1985: Round Midnight – Original Motion Picture Soundtrack (Columbia, 1986)
 1998: Gershwin's World (Verve, 1998)
 2001: Future2Future (Transparent, 2001)
 2006-07: River: The Joni Letters (Verve, 2007)
 2010: The Imagine Project (Hancock, 2010)

With Freddie Hubbard
 1961: Ready for Freddie (Blue Note, 1962)
 1962: Here to Stay (Blue Note, 1976)
 1963: The Body & the Soul (Impulse!, 1964)

With Joni Mitchell
 1977: Don Juan's Reckless Daughter (Asylum, 1977)
 1978-79: Mingus (Asylum, 1979)
 1982?: Wild Things Run Fast (Geffen, 1982)
 1984-85: Dog Eat Dog (Geffen, 1985)
 1986-87: Chalk Mark in a Rain Storm (Geffen, 1988)
 1989-90: Night Ride Home (Geffen, 1991)
 1993: Turbulent Indigo (Reprise, 1994)
 1997: Taming the Tiger (Reprise, 1998)
 1999: Both Sides Now (Reprise, 2000)
 2002: Travelogue (Nonesuch, 2002)

With Lee Morgan
 1964: Search for the New Land (Blue Note, 1966)
 1965: The Gigolo (Blue Note, 1968)
 1966: Delightfulee  (Blue Note, 1967)
 1967: Standards (Blue Note, 1998)
 1967-69: The Procrastinator (Blue Note, 1978)

With Jaco Pastorius
 1975: Jaco Pastorius (Epic, 1976)
 1980-81: Word of Mouth (Warner Bros., 1981)
 1980-82: Holiday for Pans (Sound Hills, 1993)

With Carlos Santana
 The Swing of Delight (Columbia, 1980)[2LP]
 Spirits Dancing in the Flesh (Columbia, 1990) – guest

With McCoy Tyner
 1968: Expansions (Blue Note, 1970)
 1970: Extensions (Blue Note, 1973)

With others
 Donald Byrd, Free Form (Blue Note, 1966) – recorded in 1961
 Billy Childs, Map to the Treasure (Sony Masterworks, 2014)
 Pino Daniele, Bella 'mbriana (EMI Italiana, 1982)
 Lou Donaldson, Lush Life (Blue Note, 1967)
 Benny Golson, Pop + Jazz = Swing (Audio Fidelity, 1962)
 Gil Evans, The Individualism of Gil Evans (Verve, 1964) – recorded in 1963-64
 Don Henley, The End of the Innocence (Geffen, 1989) – recorded in 1987-89 
 Toninho Horta, Diamond Land (Verve Forecast, 1988)
 Norah Jones, Day Breaks (Blue Note, 2016) – recorded in 2015
 J.J. Johnson, Heroes (Verve, 1998) – recorded in 1996
 Wynton Kelly, Kelly Great (Vee Jay, 1959)
 Michael Landau, Tales From The Bulge (Shobi Corporation, 1990)
 Bill Laswell, Bahia Black Ritual Beating System (Axiom, 1992) - released, January 28, 1992
 Lionel Loueke, Karibu (Blue Note, 2008) – recorded in 2007
 Grachan Moncur III, Some Other Stuff (Blue Note, 1965) – recorded in 1964
 Milton Nascimento, Yauaretê (Columbia, 1987) – 1 track
 Michel Petrucciani, The Power of Three (Blue Note, 1987) – recorded in 1986
 The Rolling Stones, Bridges to Babylon (Virgin, 1997) – 1 track
 Masahiko Satoh, Randooga (Epic, 1990) – live
 John Scofield, Quiet (Verve, 1996)
 Esperanza Spalding, Songwrights Apothecary Lab (Concord, 2021)
 Steely Dan, Aja (ABC, 1977) – 1 track
 Bobby Timmons, The Soul Man! (Prestige, 1966)
 Kazumi Watanabe, Kilowatt (Gramavision, 1989)
 Buster Williams, Something More (In+Out, 1989)
 Tony Williams, Spring (Blue Note, 1966) – recorded in 1965
 Joe Zawinul, Zawinul (Atlantic, 1971) – recorded in 1970

References 

Jazz discographies
Discographies of American artists